Mario Pufek (born 6 May 1985) is a Croatian retired football (defender) player who last played for Swedish amateur side IFK Ås/Åmotfors IF.

Career
Despite being born in Subotica, SR Serbia, he is part of the Croatian minority in Vojvodina, and he represented Croatian U-20 team internationally 2004–2005. Made his debut as a professional football player at age 17.

References

External links
 
HLSZ 
NB II: újabb légiósokkal erősít a Békéscsaba 
Exclusiv: Un croat în probe la Alro 
DPASE magabiztos győzelem Rákosszentmihályon  

1985 births
Living people
Sportspeople from Subotica
Croats of Vojvodina
Association football central defenders
Croatian footballers
Croatia youth international footballers
NK Belišće players
Kaposvölgye VSC footballers
NK Istra players
NK Primorac 1929 players
Békéscsaba 1912 Előre footballers
FK Bačka 1901 players
First Football League (Croatia) players
Croatian Football League players
Nemzeti Bajnokság II players
Croatian expatriate footballers
Expatriate footballers in Hungary
Croatian expatriate sportspeople in Hungary
Expatriate footballers in Sweden
Croatian expatriate sportspeople in Sweden